The Greece men's national volleyball team is the national team of Greece. It is governed by the Hellenic Volleyball Federation and takes part in international volleyball competitions.

Results
 Champions   Runners up   Third place   Fourth place

Olympic Games

World Championship

European Championship

World League

European League

Mediterranean Games

Current squad
The following is the Greek roster in the 2019 European Championship.

Head coach: Dimitrios Andreopoulos

See also
Greece women's national volleyball team

References

External links
Official website
FIVB profile

National men's volleyball teams
Volleyball in Greece
Volleyball
Men's sport in Greece